St. Augustine Catholic High School is a Separate high school in Markham, Ontario, Canada. It is a technologically oriented school, is part of the York Catholic District School Board, and opened in 2001. , it had an enrollment of 1082 students and 80 faculty members. In the Fraser Institute's Report Card on Ontario’s Secondary Schools 2019, the school was ranked 12th out of 739 secondary schools in Ontario with an overall rating of 8.8 out of 10.

Even though St. Augustine CHS has a short history, it has earned itself a distinguished reputation in the York Catholic District School Board as a strong academic school, earning high grades in the grade nine EQAO mathematics and the grade ten OSSLT. Giving many different special programs that set it apart from other high schools in Ontario. Programs like a Specialist High Skills Major (SHSM) Program and the unique STEM + Focused Laptop Program. The St. Augustine CHS STEM+ Focused Laptop Program is an inter-disciplinary approach to inquiry and problem-based learning. It incorporates real-world challenges and the engineering design process to foster critical thinking, creativity, collaboration, and communication skills guided by the traditional principles of Catholic social teachings.

Curriculum
Following the Ontario curriculum like other Catholic high schools in the York Catholic District School Board, studies at St. Augustine CHS include: Math, English language studies, Modern Language studies, Canadian and world studies, Technology, Visual Art, Musical Studies, Religion, Business, and Science.

Elementary Feeder Schools
The term "feeder schools" refers to the Elementary Schools that can populate the High School. 
 All Saints Catholic Elementary School
 St. Justin Martyr Catholic Elementary School
 St. Monica Catholic Elementary School
 Blessed John XXIII Catholic Elementary School
 St. Matthew Catholic Elementary School

See also
List of high schools in Ontario

Footnotes

Gallery

External links

York Catholic District School Board
High schools in the Regional Municipality of York
Catholic secondary schools in Ontario
Educational institutions established in 2001
Buildings and structures in Markham, Ontario
Education in Markham, Ontario
2001 establishments in Ontario